Crab meat or crab marrow  is the meat found within a crab, or more specifically, the leg of a crab. It is used in many cuisines around the world, prized for its soft, delicate and sweet taste. Brown crab (Cancer pagurus), blue crabs (Callinectes sapidus), blue swimming crabs (Portunus pelagicus), and red swimming crabs (Portunus haanii) are among the most commercially available species of crabmeat globally.

In some fisheries, crab meat is harvested by declawing of crabs. This is the process whereby one or both claws of a live crab are manually pulled off and the animal is then returned to the water. The practice is defended because some crabs can naturally autotomise (shed) limbs and then about a year later after a series of moults, regenerate these limbs.

Grades

European crab
In Western Europe crab meat is derived primarily from the species Cancer pagurus. C. pagurus is a large crab noted for the sweet, delicate flavour of its meat. It is also known as the "brown crab", the "common crab" or the "edible crab". The United Kingdom is the largest fishery for C. pagurus with large fisheries in Scotland and a smaller but substantial fishery in the South West of England in Cornwall and Devon. The best grade of crab meat is "handpicked" - this refers to the method by which the crab has been processed (by hand) and ensures the flavour of the crab meat is unadulterated. By contrast "machine processed crab" is produced by using water or air to blast the crab meat from the shell which has a detrimental effect on the flavour.  C. pagurus crab meat is widely consumed throughout the countries from where it is fished. Due to its short fresh shelf life of around 4 days, much of the crab meat available through retailers is sold from defrosted crab. White crab meat has a natural water content that crystallises when frozen. Once defrosted this leads to an alteration in the texture of the crabmeat and a loss of the natural flavour. This crab meat is also available pasteurised, which avoids the pitfalls of freezing and should, when produced with care, have a flavour almost indistinguishable from fresh crab. C. pagurus contains two types of meat:

White meat
White crab meat comes from the claws and legs of the crab and while predominantly white in colour it does have a naturally occurring red/brown tinge throughout. White crab is very low in fat and particularly high in protein, it has a delicate, sweet flavour, a sweet aroma and a naturally flaky texture. White crab meat is versatile and while it is consumed largely in sandwiches, it can be used in pastas, risottos, and salads as well as a canape topping.

Brown meat
Brown meat is from the body of the crab. It has a higher natural fat content, but is also extremely high in Omega-3. 100 g of brown crab contains  of the 3 g weekly recommended intake of Omega 3. Brown crab meat has an even pâté like texture and a rich full flavour. The color and texture of the brown meat vary throughout the year as the crab's physiology changes.

U.S. crab
For the U.S. market the meat of crabs comes in different grades, depending on which part of the crab's body it comes from and the overall size of the crab the meat is taken from.

Colossal

Colossal crab meat, sometimes called Mega Jumbo Lump, is the largest whole unbroken pieces available from the blue crab and blue swimming crab. The colossal meat is taken from the two largest muscles connected to the back swimming legs of the crab. The lumps, or pieces, in the Colossal grade are bigger than those in the Jumbo Lump.

Jumbo lump
The jumbo lump grade crab meat comes from larger crabs and is the meat from the two large muscles connected to the swimming legs. Contrary to smaller portions of crab meat, it can be used whole. It has a brilliant white color.

Lump

The Lump grade of crab meat is composed of broken pieces of Jumbo Lump, which are not included in the Jumbo Lump grade pack, and other flake pieces. This grade of crab meat is ideal for crab cakes and it is commonly used by manufacturers.

Back fin
The back fin portion consists of flakes of white meat, coming both from the special meat and the jumbo lump. Back fin is a popular crab meat for Chesapeake Bay, Maryland style crab cakes.

Special
The "special meat" is shreds and small flakes of white meat from the body cavity of the crab. It is generally used for all dishes in which white crab meat is used.

Claw
Claw meat is the dark pink meat that comes from the swimming fins and claws of the crab. It has a stronger taste, and is less expensive than the white color meat grades. It is often used in soups, where the strong taste comes through.

Claw fingers

The Claw Fingers, also called Cocktail Fingers, are the tips of the pinchers, usually served whole, with the dark pink meat still in it. They are commonly used as garnish or hors d'œuvre.

Imitation

Imitation crab meat is widely used in America as a replacement for 100% crab meat in many dishes, due to the labour-intensive process of extracting fresh crab meat, and is popularly used in American sushi (e.g. California roll).

The flaky, red-edged faux crab often served in seafood salad or California roll is most likely made of Alaska pollock. Also called walleye pollock, snow cod, or whiting, this fish is abundant in the Bering Sea near Alaska and can also be found along the central California coast and in the Sea of Japan. Pollock has a very mild flavor, making it ideal for the processing and artificial flavoring of imitation crab. While pollock is the most common fish used to make imitation crab, New Zealand hoki is also used, and some Asian manufacturers use Southeast Asian fish like golden threadfin bream and white croaker.

The processing of imitation crabmeat begins with the skinning and boning of the fish. Then the meat is minced and rinsed, and the water is leached out. This creates a thick paste called surimi. The word means "minced fish" in Japanese, and the essential techniques for making it were developed in Japan over 800 years ago. Surimi is commonly used in Japan to make a type of fish ball or cake called kamaboko. In 1975, a method for processing imitation crabmeat from surimi was invented in Japan, and in 1983, American companies started production.

Animal welfare

Declawing of crabs is the process whereby one or both claws of a live crab are manually pulled off and the animal is then returned to the water. It occurs in several fisheries worldwide, such as in the Florida stone crab (Menippe mercenaria) fishery, the north-east Atlantic deep-water red crab (Chaceon affinis) fishery and in southern Iberia, where the major claws of the fiddler crab Uca tangeri are harvested. There is scientific debate about whether crabs experience pain from this procedure, but there is evidence it increases mortality.

It is argued that declawing therefore provides a sustainable fishery, however, declawing can lead to 47% mortality and negative effects on feeding behaviour. Furthermore, once separated from the body, the claws will start to degenerate—usually, crabs are cooked moments after capture.

See also

References

External links

 
 
 
 

Seafood
Meat by animal